First-seeded Hilde Sperling defeated Simonne Mathieu 6–2, 6–4 in the final to win the women's singles tennis title at the 1937 French Championships.

Seeds
The seeded players are listed below. Hilde Sperling is the champion; others show the round in which they were eliminated.

 Hilde Sperling (champion)
 Simonne Mathieu (finalist)
 Helen Jacobs (quarterfinals)
 Margaret Scriven (quarterfinals)
 Lilly De La Valdène (semifinals)
 Jadwiga Jędrzejowska (semifinals)
 Mary Hardwick (third round)
 Sylvie Henrotin (quarterfinals)

Draw

Key
 Q = Qualifier
 WC = Wild card
 LL = Lucky loser
 r = Retired

Finals

Earlier rounds

Section 1

Section 2

Section 3

Section 4

References

External links
 

French Championships - Women's singles
1937
1937 in French women's sport
1937 in French tennis